This is a list of departments of Nicaragua by Human Development Index as of 2023 with data for the year 2021.

References 

{{DEFAULTSORT:regions of <Nicaragua by Human Development Index}}

Human Development Index
Ranked lists of country subdivisions